Darryll King (born 31 December 1968) is a former professional Grand Prix motocross racer from New Zealand.

Born in Hamilton, New Zealand, King began competing in the F.I.M. Motocross World Championships in the 1990s. He finished in the top five six times including second-place finishes in 1997 and 1998. King is also a 19-time New Zealand motocross national champion and a three-time Australian motocross champion. He is the older brother of 1996 500cc motocross world champion, Shayne King.

References

External links 
 Darryl King Interview

1968 births
Living people
Sportspeople from Hamilton, New Zealand
New Zealand motocross riders
20th-century New Zealand people